The Men's doubles squash competitions at the 2022 Commonwealth Games in Birmingham, England will take place between August 4 and 8 at the University of Birmingham Hockey and Squash Centre. A total of 50 competitors from 25 nations took part.

Schedule
The schedule is as follows:

Results
The draw is as follows:

Finals

Top half

Bottom half

References

External links
Results Birmingham

Squash at the 2022 Commonwealth Games